Ramón Souto Caride (born April 21, 1976 in Vigo, Spain) is a Spanish composer. He is the founder of the Spanish chamber orchestra Vertixe Sonora Ensemble.

Biography
Caride graduated from C.S.M. Vigo and C.L.E.M. Barcelona and went on to collaborate with the theater group Artello, making music for their shows fábula and polgariño. He then joined the experimental platform BAUR and participated in events that involved free improvisation, progressive rock, and free jazz. At the same time he presented his work in meetings and major festivals such as the Encuentro de Compositores Iberoamericanos Injuve, Villafranca, Acanthes and Festival de Música Española de Cádiz. The latter received unanimous recognition and awards including the mention of honor in the 2008 Ossia International Composition Competition (New York).

Caride has collaborated with performers such as Yi-Chung Chen, Juan Carlos Garvayo and Donatienne Michel-Dansac, and poets like Jorge Riechmann.

He is currently professor of music at the IES de Mos (Mos, Spain).

Work

 Orchestra: Todo lo que le hice a TORTOLA aquella noche.
 Instrumental Ensemble: Sexteto, In Sospenso, Fricción, Construcción de un verso, Hikmet habitado.
 Pieces by one instrument: Mi gran dolor americano.
 Vocal pieces:
Mixed a cappella: Coro: 2 choral poems, first 6 poems, playground and  Quer pouco .
Voice and piano: 2 poems and 5 songs.
 Electro: Backettianas 1 and 2.
 Music Theatre: In fable and polgariño.
 Projects Vertixe Sonora Ensemble

Filmography
 Correspondencias Sonoras (2013) by Manuel del Río.

References

MC:: "Una obra artística tiene que ser peligrosa"
SUL PONTICELLO - Detrito Monocromía (2011) - Ramón Souto

External links
 Official Web Site of Ramón Souto

1976 births
Spanish composers
Spanish male composers
Living people